The Fiat A.53 was a seven-cylinder, air-cooled radial piston engine developed in Italy in the 1930s as a powerplant for aircraft.

Applications
 Caproni Ca.100
 CNA Delta
 Fiat TR.1
 Savoia-Marchetti S.56

Specifications (A.53)

See also

References

A.53
1930s aircraft piston engines